Tsedengiin Narmandakh (born 15 November 1956) is a Mongolian boxer. He competed in the men's bantamweight event at the 1980 Summer Olympics.

References

External links
 

1956 births
Living people
Mongolian male boxers
Olympic boxers of Mongolia
Boxers at the 1980 Summer Olympics
Place of birth missing (living people)
Bantamweight boxers
20th-century Mongolian people